"I Met a Girl" is a debut song recorded by American country music singer William Michael Morgan for his self-titled extended play which was released in 2016. It was released with a radio add date of August 24, 2015, by Warner Bros. Nashville. It was also included on his debut studio album Vinyl, which was released on September 30, 2016. The song was written by Sam Hunt, Trevor Rosen, and Shane McAnally, and produced by Jimmy Ritchey and Scott Hendricks. Sam Hunt recorded an acoustic version of the track for his 2013 mixtape Between the Pines.

Critical reception
The song has received positive reviews from music critics: Taste of Country awarded "I Met a Girl" with the Taste of Country Critic's Pick, saying that the single is "a warm country love song that slows time" and adding that "strong songwriting and Morgan’s smooth baritone make the song tough to resist."

The song has sold 282,000 copies in the US as of November 2016.

Chart performance

Weekly charts

Year end charts

References 

2015 debut singles
2015 songs
William Michael Morgan songs
Sam Hunt songs
Songs written by Trevor Rosen
Songs written by Shane McAnally
Songs written by Sam Hunt
Song recordings produced by Scott Hendricks
Warner Records Nashville singles
Warner Records singles